The Caproni Ca.22 was a single-engine monoplane made by the Italian company Aeronautica Caproni in 1913.

Design
Developed on the initiative of Giovanni Battista "Gianni" Caproni was made in a single sample for research purposes to study the characteristics of an aircraft equipped with an angle wing of variable incidence. In fact, the wing was in three pieces and was anteriorly hinged on the front side member which served as a rotation axis for the same; the variation of incidence of the wing was commanded by a handwheel that commanded a helical tube that acted on the rear pylon. Moreover, with a system of tie-rods, the rear planes of the tail were controlled so as to compensate for the variations in pressure exerted on the wing, maintaining the longitudinal equilibrium of the optimal aircraft.

The Ca.22 in 1913 obtained various world records of height and ascent.

Operational history
On June 30, 1915 the pilots of the 15th Reconnaissance and Combat Squadron withdraw the Caproni 2 Parasol 100 hp to Vizzola Ticino, taking them to the flight field of Pordenone but after the accidents on the new aircraft, one of which causes the death of a pilot for the breaking of a wing, the squadron was dissolved on September 15, 1915.

Variants
Ca.22 Single-engine monoplane with variable-incidence mainplanes, powered by an Gnome Lambda rotary engine
Ca.23 Fixed incidence wing,  Fiat engine.
Ca.24  Fixed incidence wing,  Gnome 9 Delta engine, produced in series.

Specifications (Ca.22)

References

Further reading

Ca.022
1910s Italian experimental aircraft
Military aircraft of World War I
Shoulder-wing aircraft
Single-engined tractor aircraft
Aircraft first flown in 1913